Merogais was an early Frankish king, who, along with his co-ruler Ascaric, is the earliest Frankish ruler known. He was an enemy of the Roman Empire. Merogais is mentioned in the Panegyrici latini (anonymous VI and VII) and by Eutropius and Eumenius. The very existence of Merogais depends on the manuscript reading of Johann Kaspar Zeuss. The sentence which names the two kings begins with Asacari or Assaccari in all manuscripts, but it ends with the corrupt forms cinere gaisique, cumero geasique, cymero craisique, and cymero caisique. Zeuss reads those sentences as ending respectively cum Neregaisique, cum Merogeasique, cum Merocraisique, and cum Merocaisique, each meaning as "and with Merogais". 

In 306 he and Ascaric led a Frankish raid across the Rhine into southern Gaul while Constantine the Great was campaigning against the Picts in Britannia. Apparently the two had made a previous agreement with Rome not to cross the border, since Constantine sought to punish them as traitors upon his return. The two chieftains were defeated, captured, and executed "for their past crimes", an act which "bound with fear the slippery loyalty of the whole race," according to one of the emperor's anonymous panegyrists. The execution took place in one of the chief cities of Gaul, probably Trier, and the two Franks and their followers were torn apart by animals in the amphitheatre before a large crowd. Their defeat was followed by the subjection of the Bructeri.

References
Howorth, Henry H. (1884). "The Ethnology of Germany: Part VI. The Varini, Varangians, and Franks, Section II". The Journal of the Anthropological Institute of Great Britain and Ireland, 13:213–237. 
Landriot, Jean-François-Anne, and Rochet, Benoît Joseph (1854). Traduction des discours d'Eumène: accompagnée du texte. Autun: Michel Dejussieu et Louis Villedry. 
Long, Jacqueline (1996). Claudian's In Eutropium: Or, How, When, and Why to Slander a Eunuch. Chapel Hill: UNC Press. .

306 deaths
Frankish kings
Frankish warriors
4th-century Frankish people
4th-century monarchs in Europe
Year of birth unknown